A sperm bank, semen bank, or cryobank is a facility or enterprise which purchases, stores and sells human semen. The semen is produced and sold by men who are known as sperm donors. The sperm is purchased by or for other persons for the purpose of achieving a pregnancy or pregnancies other than by a sexual partner. Sperm sold by a sperm donor is known as donor sperm.

A sperm bank may be a separate entity supplying donor sperm to individuals or to fertility centers or clinics, or it may be a facility which is run by a clinic or other medical establishment mainly or exclusively for their patients or customers.

A pregnancy may be achieved using donor sperm for insemination with similar outcomes to sexual intercourse. By using sperm from a donor rather than from the sperm recipient's partner, the process is a form of third party reproduction. In the 21st century artificial insemination with donor sperm from a sperm bank is most commonly used for individuals with no male partner, i.e. single women and coupled lesbians.

A sperm donor must generally meet specific requirements regarding age and screening for medical history. In the United States, sperm banks are regulated as Human Cell and Tissue or Cell and Tissue Bank Product (HCT/Ps) establishments by the Food and Drug Administration. Many states also have regulations in addition to those imposed by the FDA. In the European Union a sperm bank must have a license according to the EU Tissue Directive. In the United Kingdom, sperm banks are regulated by the Human Fertilisation and Embryology Authority.

General
The first sperm banks began as early as 1964 in Iowa, USA and Tokyo, Japan and were established for a medical therapeutic approach to support individuals who were infertile. As a result, over 1 million babies were born within 40 years.

Sperm banks provide the opportunity for individuals to have a child who otherwise would not be able to conceive naturally. This includes, but is not limited to, single women, same-sexed couples, and couples where one partner is infertile.

Where a sperm bank provides fertility services directly to a recipient woman, it may employ different methods of fertilization using donor sperm in order to optimize the chances of a pregnancy. Sperm banks do not provide a cure for infertility in individuals who produce non-viable sperm. Nevertheless, the increasing range of services available through sperm banks enables people to have choices over challenges with reproduction.

Individuals may choose an anonymous donor who will not be a part of family life, or they may choose known donors who may be contacted later in life by the donor children. People may choose to use a surrogate to bear their children, using eggs provided by the person and sperm from a donor. Sperm banks often provide services which enable an individual to have subsequent pregnancies by the same donor, but equally, people may choose to have children by a number of different donors. Sperm banks sometimes enable an individual to choose the sex of their child, enabling even greater control over the way families are planned. Sperm banks increasingly adopt a less formal approach to the provision of their services thereby enabling people to take a relaxed approach to their own individual requirements.

Men who donate semen through a sperm bank provide an opportunity for others who cannot have children on their own. Sperm donors may or may not have legal obligations or responsibilities to the child conceived through this route. Whether a donor is anonymous or not, this factor is important in allowing sperm banks to recruit sperm donors and to use their sperm to produce whatever number of pregnancies from each donor as are permitted where they operate, or alternatively, whatever number they decide.

In many parts of the world sperm banks are not allowed to be established or to operate. Where sperm banks are allowed to operate they are often controlled by local legislation which is primarily intended to protect the unborn child, but which may also provide a compromise between the conflicting views which surround their operation. A particular example of this is the control which is often placed on the number of children which a single donor may father and which may be designed to protect against consanguinity. However, such legislation usually cannot prevent a sperm bank from supplying donor sperm outside the jurisdiction in which it operates, and neither can it prevent sperm donors from donating elsewhere during their lives. There is an acute shortage of sperm donors in many parts of the world and there is obvious pressure from many quarters for donor sperm from those willing and able to provide it to be made available as safely and as freely as possible.

Recruitment
The finding of a potential sperm donor and motivating them to actually donate sperm is typically called recruitment. A sperm bank can recruit donors by advertising, often in colleges, in local newspapers, and also on the internet.

A donor must be a fit and healthy male, normally between 18 and 45 years of age, and willing to undergo frequent and rigorous testing. The donor must also be willing to donate their sperm so that it can be used to impregnate people who are unrelated to and unknown by them. Some sperm banks require two screenings and a laboratory screening before a donor is eligible. The donor must agree to relinquish all legal rights to all children which result from their donations. The donor must produce their sperm at the sperm bank thus enabling the identity of the donor, once proven, always to be ascertained, and also enabling fresh samples of sperm to be produced for immediate processing. Some sperm banks have been accused of heightism due to minimum height requirements.

Screening of donors

A sperm bank will aim to provide donor sperm which is safe by the checking and screening donors and of their semen. A sperm donor must generally meet specific requirements regarding age and medical history. Requirements for sperm donors are strictly enforced, as in a study of 24,040 potential sperm donors, only 5620, or 23.38% were eligible to donate their sperm.

Sperm banks typically screen potential donors for a range of diseases and disorders, including genetic diseases, chromosomal abnormalities and sexually transmitted infections that may be transmitted through sperm. The screening procedure generally also includes a quarantine period, in which the samples are frozen and stored for at least six months after which the donor will be re-tested for the STIs. This is to ensure no new infections have been acquired or have developed during the period of donation. Providing the result is negative, the sperm samples can be released from quarantine and used in treatments. Common reasons for sperm rejection include suboptimal semen quality and STDs. Chromosomal abnormalities are also a cause for semen rejection, but are less common. Children conceived through sperm donation have a birth defect rate of almost a fifth compared with the general population.

A sperm bank takes a number of steps to ensure the health and quality of the sperm which it supplies and it will inform customers of the checks which it undertakes, providing relevant information about individual donors. A sperm bank will usually guarantee the quality and number of motile sperm available in a sample after thawing. They will try to select men as donors who are particularly fertile and whose sperm will survive the freezing and thawing process. Samples are often sold as containing a particular number of motile sperm per milliliter, and different types of sample may be sold by a sperm bank for differing types of use, e.g. ICI or IUI.

The sperm will be checked to ensure its fecundity and also to ensure that motile sperm will survive the freezing process. If a man is accepted onto the sperm bank's program as a sperm donor, his sperm will be constantly monitored, the donor will be regularly checked for infectious diseases, and samples of his blood will be taken at regular intervals. A sperm bank may provide a donor with dietary supplements containing herbal or mineral substances such as maca, zinc, vitamin E and arginine which are designed to improve the quality and quantity of the donor's semen, as well as reducing the refractory time (i.e. the time between viable ejaculations). All sperm is frozen in straws or vials and stored for as long as the sperm donor may and can maintain it.

Donors are subject to tests for infectious diseases such as human immunoviruses HIV (HIV-1 and HIV-2), human T-cell lymphotropic viruses (HTLV-1 and HTLV-2), syphilis, chlamydia, gonorrhea, hepatitis B virus, hepatitis C virus, cytomegalovirus (CMV), Trypanosoma cruzi and malaria as well as hereditary diseases such as cystic fibrosis, Sickle cell anemia, Familial Mediterranean fever, Gaucher's disease, thalassaemia, Tay–Sachs disease, Canavan's disease, familial dysautonomia, congenital adrenal hyperplasia, carnitine transporter deficiency and Karyotyping 46XY. Karyotyping is not a requirement in either EU or the US but some sperm banks choose to test donors as an extra service to the customer.

A sperm donor may also be required to produce their medical records and those of their family, often for several generations. A sperm sample is usually tested micro-biologically at the sperm bank before it is prepared for freezing and subsequent use. A sperm donor's blood group may also be registered to ensure compatibility with the recipient.

Some sperm banks may disallow sexually active gay men from donating sperm due to the population's increased risk of HIV and hepatitis B. Modern sperm banks have also been known to screen out potential donors based on genetic conditions and family medical history.

Donor payment
The majority of sperm donors who donate their sperm through a sperm bank receive some kind of payment, although this is rarely a significant amount. A review including 29 studies from nine countries came to the result that the amount of money actual donors received for their donation varied from $10 to €70 per donation or sample. The payments vary from the situation in the United Kingdom where donors are only entitled to their expenses in connection with the donation, to the situation with some US sperm banks where a donor receives a set fee for each donation plus an additional amount for each vial stored. At one prominent California sperm bank for example, TSBC, donors receive roughly $50 for each donation (ejaculation) which has acceptable motility/survival rates both at donation and at a test-thaw a couple of days later. Because of the requirement for the two-day celibacy period before donation, and geographical factors which usually require the donor to travel, it is not a viable way to earn a significant income—and is far less lucrative than selling human eggs. Some private donors may seek remuneration although others donate for altruistic reasons. According to the EU Tissue Directive donors in EU may only receive compensation, which is strictly limited to making good the expenses and inconveniences related to the donation.

Collection
A sperm donor will usually be required to enter into a contract with a sperm bank to supply their semen, typically for a period of six to twenty-four months depending on the number of pregnancies which the sperm bank intends to produce from the donor. If a sperm bank has access to world markets e.g. by direct sales, or sales to clinics outside their own jurisdiction, a man may donate for a longer period than two years, as the risk of consanguinity is reduced (although local laws vary widely). Some sperm banks with access to world markets impose their own rules on the number of pregnancies which can be achieved in a given regional area or a state or country, and these sperm banks may permit donors to donate for four or five years, or even longer.

The contract may also specify the place and hours for donation, a requirement to notify the sperm bank in the case of acquiring a sexual infection, and the requirement not to have intercourse or to masturbate for a period of usually 2–3 days before making a donation.

The contract may also describe the types of treatment for which the donated sperm may be used, such as artificial insemination and IVF, and whether the donor's sperm may be used in surrogacy arrangements. It may also stipulate whether the sperm may be used for research or training purposes. In certain cases, a sperm donor may specify the maximum number of offspring or families which may be produced from the donor's sperm. 'Family' may be defined as a couple who may each bear children from the same donor. The contract may also require consent if the donor's samples are to be exported. In the United Kingdom, for example, the maximum number of families for which a donor is permitted to bear children is ten, but a sperm bank or fertility center in the UK may export sperm to other fertility centers so that this may be used to produce more pregnancies abroad. Where this happens, consent must be provided by the donor. Faced with a growing demand for donor sperm, sperm banks may try to maximize the use of a donor whilst still reducing the risk of consanguinity. In legislations with a national register of sperm donors or a national regulatory body, a sperm donor may be required to fill in a separate form of consent which will be registered with the regulatory authority. In the United Kingdom this body is the HFEA.

A sperm donor generally produces and collects sperm at a sperm bank or clinic by masturbation in a private room or cabin, known as a 'men's production room' (UK), 'donor cabin' (DK) or a masturbatorium (US). Many of these facilities contain pornography such as videos/DVD, magazines, and/or photographs which may assist the donor in becoming aroused in order to facilitate production of the ejaculate, also known as the "semen sample" but the increasing usage of porn in the U.S. has dulled many men to its effects. Often, using any type of personal lubricant, saliva, oil or anything else to lubricate and stimulate the genitals is prohibited as it can contaminate the semen sample and have negative impacts on the quality and health of sperm.  In some circumstances, it may also be possible for semen from donors to be collected during sexual intercourse with the use of a collection condom which results in higher sperm counts.

Processing sperm
After collection, sperm must be processed for storage. According to the Sperm Bank of California, sperm banks and clinics can use the 'unwashed' or 'wash' method to process sperm samples. The 'wash' method includes removing unwanted particles and adding buffer solutions to preserve viable sperm. However, this approach can contribute to further stress on the sperm cells and decrease the survival of sperm after freezing. The 'unwashed' approach allows for more flexibility to freeze the semen sample and increases the number of sperm survival. One sample can produce 1–20 vials or straws, depending on the quantity of the ejaculate and whether the sample is 'washed' or 'unwashed'. 'Unwashed' samples are used for intracervical insemination (ICI) treatments, and 'washed' samples are used in intrauterine insemination (IUI) and for in-vitro fertilization (IVF) or assisted reproduction technologies (ART) procedures.

A cryoprotectant semen extender is conducted if the semen sample is placed in the freezer for storage. Semen extenders play a key factor in protecting sperm sample from 'freeze and osmotic shock, oxidative stress, and cell injury' due to the formation of ice crystal during frozen storage. The collection of semen is preserved by stabilizing the properties of the sperm cells such as the membrane, motility, and 'DNA integrity' in order to create a sustainable viable environment. There are two common forms of medium for sperm cyropreservation, one containing of egg yolk from hens and glycerol, and the other containing just glycerol. One study compared media supplemented with egg yolk and media supplemented with soy lecithin, finding that there was no significance between sperm motility, morphology, chromatin decondensation, or binding between the two, indicating that soy lecithin may be a viable alternative to egg yolk.

Storage

After the sample has been processed for cryoprotection, the sperm is stored in small vials or straws holding between 0.4 and 1.0 ml of sperm and then cryogenically preserved in liquid nitrogen tanks. Two approaches for sperm cryoperservation include conventional freezing and vitrification. The conventional technique consist of a slow freezing process that is most commonly used for assisted reproduction technologies (ART). Whereas the vitrification method is a faster approach for sperm cryopreservation in converting liquid to solid state. The disadvantage of this latter process is increase in contamination from the liquid nitrogen and smaller sperm sample size to improve the speed for 'high cooling rate'.

It has been proposed that there should be an upper limit on how long frozen sperm can be stored; however, a baby has been conceived in the United Kingdom using sperm frozen for 21 years and andrology experts believe sperm can be frozen indefinitely. The UK government places an upper limit for storage of 55 years.

Following the necessary quarantine period, which is usually six months, a sample will be thawed. To thaw a sperm sample, the vial or straw is left at room temperature for approximately 30 minutes, and then brought to body temperature by holding it in the hands of the person performing the insemination. Once a sperm sample is thawed, it cannot be frozen again, and should be used to artificially inseminate a recipient or used for another assisted reproduction technologies (ART) treatment immediately.

Freeze-drying is another promising alternative for storing semen for its accessibility with regular refrigerator. This method has been successfully replicated in animal species. However, DNA can be damaged in this process, therefore further research is warranted to determine factors that can effect the efficacy of this method.

Demographics of people that utilize sperm donor/bank services

Demographics 
One study conducted by investigators at the University of North Carolina Chapel Hill looked into donated sperm utilization within the United States from 1995 to 2017. Cross-sectional studies recorded that an estimated 170,701 individuals during 1995 used donated sperm, while the 2011 to 2013 cohort had a decreased amount of donated sperm use of 37,385. Most recently, in the 2015 to 2017 cohort, 440,986 individuals were reported to use donated sperm. When looking at 200,197 individuals across 2011–2017, 76% had a 4-year college degree or further while 24% had high school or 2-year college degree. In terms of household percent of poverty, 71% of the sperm bank users were at or above 400% of the household poverty level while only 11% were between 200 and 399% of the household poverty levels. Although the household income levels were not explicit, there seems to be an obvious trend that higher education level attainment (such as finishing college or higher) and being at much higher income level above the household poverty levels were the common tendencies in the sperm bank users.

Controversy 
Based on the statistics presented in earlier discussions, there is controversy with regard to a perceived lack of diversity within the donor sperm pool of many sperm banks. This includes, but is not limited to, height requirements implemented by some sperm banks. As a result, it is alleged that potential sperm recipients often encounter very limited sperm donor pool options. Lack of diversity results in very limited choices especially among ethnic minorities within the United States. Whenever, an individual wanted to select their preferred background: the number of available options would dwindle between 1–5 sperm donors that meet the particular individual's criteria. Even Scott Brown from California Cryobank admitted: "we don't get as many minority applicants as we like." And even after numerous attempts to reach out to numerous ethnic communities, responses were almost zero.

At the California Cryoback, Brown mentions that one out of 100 would be able to become final sperm donor while Ottey from the Fairfax Cryobank mentions one out of 200 would be able to become ultimate sperm donors. In addition, locations of the California Cryobank are in Los Angeles, Los Altos, California; mid-Manhattan, and Cambridge Massachusetts. These locations are known to have a population with higher socioeconomic latitude and being more likely to afford the services. Moreover, one of the requirements includes the potential sperm donor to be able to live nearby the sperm bank in order to provide samples once to twice a month for at least a term of six months. This could create potential barriers for populations who are at socioeconomic disadvantage and do not have their own forms of transportation; often having to rely on multiple forms of public transportation to reach certain places. This factor could cause a significant decrease in the sperm donor pool and less diverse availability for sperm recipients.

Some controversy stems from the fact that donors father children for others, in the majority of cases, for single people or same-sex couples, but usually take no part in the upbringing of such children. The issue of sperm banks providing fertility services to single women and coupled lesbians so that they can have their own biological children by a donor is itself, often controversial in some jurisdictions but in many countries where sperm banks operate, this group form the main body of recipients. Donors usually do not have a say in who may be a recipient of their sperm.

Another controversy centers around the use of sperm posthumously, or after the death of the sperm donor, as pioneered by California Cryobank. Within the United States, there were differences when it came to a child conceived after the father's death and the eligibility for survivor's benefits. Under California law, there was one court case (Vernoff vs. Astrue) in which the mother's child (conceived after the father's death) was not eligible for the survivor's benefits. However, Arizona courts had a different approach when it came to children who were born after father's death that the children are eligible for the survivors benefits. There were numerous other stories of similar situations across different states in the United States and even the United Kingdom. Canada, France, Germany, and Sweden do not permit the retrieval use of sperm posthumously.

Services

Use
Subject to any regulations restricting who can obtain donor sperm, donor sperm is available to all people who, for whatever reason, wish to have a child. These regulations vary significantly between jurisdictions, and some countries do not have any regulations. When in individual finds that they are barred from receiving donor sperm within their jurisdiction, they may travel to another jurisdiction to obtain sperm. Regulations change from time to time. In most jurisdictions, donor sperm is available to an individual if their partner is infertile or where they has a genetic disorder. However, the categories of individuals who may obtain donor sperm is expanding, with its availability to single persons and to same-sex couples becoming more common, and some sperm banks supply fertility centers which specialize in the treatment of such people.

Frozen vials of donor sperm may be shipped by the sperm bank to a recipient's home for self-insemination, or they may be shipped to a fertility clinic or physician for use in fertility treatments. The sperm bank will rely on the recipient woman or medical practitioner to report the outcome of any use of the sperm to the sperm bank. This enables to sperm bank to adhere to any national limits of pregnancy numbers. The sperm bank may also impose its own worldwide limit on numbers.

Sperm is introduced into the recipient by means of artificial insemination or by IVF. The most common technique is conventional artificial insemination which consists of a catheter to put the sperm into the vagina where it is deposited at the entrance to the cervix. In biological terms, this is much the same process as when semen is ejaculated from the penis during sexual intercourse. Owing to its simplicity, this method of insemination is commonly used for home and self inseminations principally by single women and lesbians. Other types of uses include intrauterine insemination (IUI) and deep intrauterine artificial insemination where 'washed' sperm must be used. These methods of insemination are most commonly used in fertility centers and clinics mainly because they produces better pregnancy rates than ICI insemination especially where the woman has no underlying fertility issues.

Men may also store their own sperm at a sperm bank for future use particularly where they anticipate traveling to a war zone or having to undergo chemotherapy which might damage the testes.

Sperm from a sperm donor may also be used in surrogacy arrangements and for creating embryos for embryo donation. Donor sperm may be supplied by the sperm bank directly to the recipient to enable a woman to perform her own artificial insemination which can be carried out using a needleless syringe or a cervical cap conception device. The cervical cap conception device allows the donor semen to be held in place close to the cervix for between six and eight hours to allow fertilization to take place. Alternatively, donor sperm can be supplied by a sperm bank through a registered medical practitioner who will perform an appropriate method of insemination or IVF treatment using the donor sperm in order for the woman to become pregnant.

Choosing donors

Information about donor
In the United States, sperm banks maintain lists or catalogs of donors which provide basic information about the donor such as racial origin, skin color, height, weight, colour of eyes, and blood group. Some of these catalogs are available for browsing on the Internet, while others are made available to patients only when they apply to a sperm bank for treatment. Some sperm banks make additional information about each donor available for an additional fee, and others make additional basic information known to children produced from donors when those children reach the age of 18. Some clinics offer "exclusive donors" whose sperm is used to produce pregnancies for only one recipient woman. How accurate this is, or can be, is not known, and neither is it known whether the information produced by sperm banks, or by the donors themselves, is true. Many sperm banks will, however, carry out whatever checks they can to verify the information they request, such as checking the identity of the donor and contacting his own doctor to verify medical details.

In the United Kingdom, most donors are anonymous at the point of donation and recipients can see only non-identifying information about their donor (height, weight, ethnicity etc.). Donors need to provide identifying information to the clinic and clinics will usually ask the donor's doctor to confirm any medical details they have been given. Donors are asked to provide a pen portrait of themselves which is held by the HFEA and can be obtained by the adult conceived from the donation at the age of 18, along with identifying information such as the donor's name and last known address. Known donation is permitted and it is not uncommon for family or friends to donate to a recipient couple.

Qualities that potential recipients typically prefer in donors include the donors being tall, college educated, and with a consistently high sperm count.
A review came to the result that 68% of donors had given information to the clinical staff regarding physical characteristics and education but only 16% had provided additional information such as hereditary aptitudes and temperament or character.

Recipient's selection of donors
Sperm banks make information available about the sperm donors whose donations they hold to enable customers to select the donor whose sperm they wish to use. This information is often available by way of an online catalog. Subscription fees to be able to view the sperm donor through California Cryobank, for example, start at $145. This cost could potentially be a barrier for many on limited income and may not have discretionary income to spend on sperm donor services.

A sperm bank will also usually have facilities to help customers to make their choice and they will be able to advise on the suitability of donors for individual donors and their partners.

Where the recipient has a partner, they may prefer to use sperm from a donor whose physical features are similar to those of their partner if they have one. In some cases, the choice of a donor with the correct blood group will be paramount, with particular considerations for the protection of recipients with negative blood groups. If a surrogate is to be used, such as where the customer is not intending to carry the child, considerations about their blood group etc. will also need to be taken into account. Similar considerations will apply where both partners in a lesbian couple intend to have a child using the same donor.

Information made available by a sperm bank will usually include the race, height, weight, blood group, health and eye color of the donor. Sometimes information about the donor's age, family history and educational achievements will also be given. Some sperm banks make a 'personal profile' of a donor available and occasionally more information may be purchased about a donor, either in the form of a DVD or in written form. Catalogs usually state whether samples supplied by a particular donor have already given rise to pregnancies, but this is not necessarily a guide to the fecundity of the sperm since a donor may not have been in the program long enough for any pregnancies to have been recorded. The donor's educational qualification is also taken into account when choosing a donor.

If an individual intends to have more than one child, they may wish to have the additional child or children by the same donor. Sperm banks will usually advise whether sufficient stocks of sperm are available from a particular donor for subsequent pregnancies, and they normally have facilities available so that the woman may purchase and store additional vials from that donor on payment of an appropriate fee. These will be stored until required for subsequent pregnancies or they may be on-sold if they become surplus to the woman's requirements.

The catalogue will also state whether samples of sperm are available for ICI, IUI, or IVF use.

Sex selection

Some sperm banks enable recipients to choose the sex of their child, through methods of sperm sorting. Although the methods used do not guarantee 100% success, the chances of being able to select the gender of a child are held to be considerably increased.

One of the processes used is the 'swim up' method, whereby a sperm extender is added to the donor's freshly ejaculated sperm and the test-tube is left to settle. After about half-an-hour, the lighter sperm, containing the male chromosome pair (XY), will have swum to the top, leaving the heavier sperm, containing the female chromosome pair (XX), at the bottom, thus allowing selection and storage according to sex.

The alternative process is the Percoll Method which is similar to the 'swim up' method but involves additionally the centrifuging of the sperm in a similar way to the washing of samples produced for IUI inseminations, or for IVF purposes.

Sex selection is not permitted in a number of countries, including the UK.

Other uses

There is a market for vials of processed sperm and for various reasons a sperm bank may sell-on stocks of vials which it holds which is known as 'onselling'. The costs of screening of donors and of storage of frozen donor sperm vials are not insignificant and in practice most sperm banks will try to dispose of all samples from an individual donor. The onselling of sperm therefore enables a sperm bank to maximize the sale and disposal of sperm samples which it has processed. The reasons for onselling may also be where part of, or even the main business of, a particular sperm bank is to process and store sperm rather than to use it in fertility treatments, or where a sperm bank is able to collect and store more sperm than it can use within nationally set limits. In the latter case a sperm bank may onsell sperm from a particular donor for use in another jurisdiction after the number of pregnancies achieved from that donor has reached its national maximum.

Sperm banks may supply other sperm banks or a fertility clinic with donor sperm to be used for achieving pregnancies.

Sperm banks may also supply sperm for research or educational purposes.

Regulation

In the United States, sperm banks are regulated as Human Cell and Tissue or Cell and Tissue Bank Product (HCT/Ps) establishments by the Food and Drug Administration (FDA) with new guidelines in effect May 25, 2005. Many states also have regulations in addition to those imposed by the FDA, including New York and California.

In the European Union a sperm bank must have a license according to the EU Tissue Directive which came into effect on April 7, 2006. In the United Kingdom, sperm banks are regulated by the Human Fertilisation and Embryology Authority.

In countries where sperm banks are allowed to operate, the sperm donor will not usually become the legal father of the children produced from the sperm he donates, but he will be the 'biological father' of such children. In cases of surrogacy involving embryo donation, a form of 'gestational surrogacy', the 'commissioning mother' or the 'commissioning parents' will not be biologically related to the child and may need to go through an adoption procedure.

As with other forms of third party reproduction, the use of donor sperm from a sperm bank gives rise to a number of moral, legal, and ethical issues, including, but not limited to the right of the sperm donor remaining anonymous, and the child's right to know their familial background.

Furthermore, as local regulations reduce the size of the donor pool and, in some cases, exclude entire classes of potential buyers such as single women and lesbian couples, restricting donations to only heterosexual couples who are married. Some customers choose to buy abroad or on the internet, having the samples delivered at home.

Abuse 
There have been reports of incidents of abuse regarding forced insemination with sperm samples bought online.

Further abuse of sperm banks comes from the fertility clinic staff themselves. There have been a number of reports of staff at sperm banks and fertility clinics providing their own sperm in place of donor sperm. There have also been cases in which men have claimed their sperm sample was used by a clinic to inseminate a woman without his consent. This has led to cases of malpractice, and in some states, lobbying to create fertility fraud laws. These incidents have also led to outcry by people who had been conceived by such incidents, raising concerns of consanguinity, as well as the simple right to know who their siblings and biologic parents are.

See also 

 Ova bank
 Gene bank
 Genetic counseling
 Surrogacy
 New eugenics
 Donor conceived people
 Genetic testing
 Assisted reproduction
 Designer babies
 Accidental incest
 Milk bank

References

Further reading

External links 

Fertility medicine
Sperm donation
Cryobiology
Biorepositories